Highton is a surname. Notable people with the surname include:

Edward Highton (1924–1985), English cricketer
Elena Highton de Nolasco (born 1942), Argentine lawyer and judge
Hec Highton (1923–1985), Canadian ice hockey player
Henry Highton (1816–1874), English schoolmaster, clergyman and writer
Jack Kenneth Highton (1904–1988), British Royal Navy admiral
Paul Highton (born 1976), Welsh rugby league player
Richard Highton (born 1927), American herpetologist